Eli Erlick (born July 10, 1995) is an American activist, writer, academic, trans woman and founder of the organization Trans Student Educational Resources.

Early life
Eli Erlick was born on July 10, 1995. Her parents met while protesting, which she cites as a background behind her activism. She is of Jewish heritage and grew up near the rural community of Willits, California. She came out as transgender when she was 8 years old, when she started to experience harassment, isolation, and violence. She could not use her school's restroom and was threatened and bullied for years after.

At age 13, she publicly transitioned to female, keeping her birth name. She medically transitioned shortly after. She then began her work in advocacy and writing at 15 and founded the organization Trans Student Educational Resources at age 16. She attended Pitzer College in Claremont from 2013 to 2016, where she graduated early with honors.

Activism
Erlick cites starting activism at age 15, in 2010, when she became a board member for an LGBTQ youth conference. She became public in media over a year later while advocating for California's School Success and Opportunity Act, the first state bill to protect transgender students. That year Erlick co-founded Trans Student Educational Resources, an organization "dedicated to transforming the educational environment for trans and gender nonconforming students through advocacy and empowerment."

While advocating for admissions for trans students at women's colleges, she spoke about the importance of remaining skeptical of all policy work. In 2015, Erlick published an article on why equality should not be the goal of the transgender movement. For her organizing, Erlick has been recognized in Refinery29 and The Advocate among other publications.

In 2015, she led national efforts with Trans Student Educational Resources to admit trans women at women's colleges. She also co-authored Trans Student Educational Resources' model policy for admissions of trans students at women's colleges.

Erlick also co-founded Trans Youth Leadership Summit, a program run through Trans Student Educational Resources. It is the only national fellowship program in the United States for transgender youth. Several of its fellows have gone on to become prominent media advocates, activists, and organizers since its launch. In 2017, she began publicly advocating for self-expression of gender-nonconforming transgender women.

Erlick and a group of transgender activists erected a bronze sculpture of activist Marsha P. Johnson in 2021 in Christopher Park. The sculpture was not authorized by New York City Parks but later received a use permit, making it the first sculpture of a transgender person in New York City. The sculpture received positive reviews from art commentators, citing the criticism of George Segal's Stonewall National Monument for "whitewashing" the Stonewall Riots. The New York City Mayor's office announced plans for a statue of Johnson and her collaborator, Sylvia Rivera, in 2019 but the statues never came to fruition.

In February 2022, Erlick alleged that conservative political commentator Matt Walsh was "attempting to dupe dozens of trans people and doctors into participating in an anti-trans documentary under false pretenses". She uncovered that Walsh created a front organization, the Gender Unity Project, after his producer attempted to recruit her into the project. Walsh later revealed the project was part of his upcoming film, What is a Woman?.

Trans Student Educational Resources

In 2011, at age 16, Erlick co-founded Trans Student Educational Resources, an organization "dedicated to transforming the educational environment for trans and gender nonconforming students through advocacy and empowerment."
It is the only national organization led by transgender youth. It is one of the largest transgender organizations in the United States.

Access to hormone therapy
In August 2022, conservatives including Tucker Carlson, Matt Walsh, and Blaire White, criticized Erlick for detailing a plan on social media for individuals to send spare hormone therapy prescriptions to people in those U.S. states which are working to criminalize such drugs, despite the law only allowing such drugs to be prescribed by a physician. Some conservatives reported her to federal authorities, including the U.S. Drug Enforcement Administration.

Chaya Raichik announced her account Libs of TikTok was suspended from Twitter after accusing Erlick of distributing the medications.

Walsh accused Erlick of being a "confessed drug dealer" and later reported Erlick to the University of California, Santa Cruz, where she is a PhD candidate. After the university's leadership initially ignored Walsh, he shared the contact information for several leaders of the university on social media. The university then said in a statement that "as a campus continuously working in pursuit of social justice," it "strongly supports transgender members of our community.", adding that "The university is aware of social media posts by one of our graduate students related to gender-affirming medical care outlawed in certain states. The university takes allegations of illegal activity seriously, harassment included." Erlick defended herself from criticism, saying that "all trans people should have access to gender-affirming care" and that "trans people have shared hormone replacement therapy treatments for over 80 years. This is nothing new or unique. It is important to add that no one is providing hormone replacement therapy to children and the accusations that I am are false and absurd." Erlick also accused Walsh of "profiting from the moral panic over transness through new followers, advertisers and pageviews. Money, fame and power are his only goals." Following Walsh's comments about her, Erlick received slurs, harassment, and threats of violence.

Erlick and other activists accused Walsh of stochastic terrorism, a term used to describe an incitement of violence against a target through social media with plausible deniability. Walsh denied these accusations of terrorism, arguing that sharing contact information that is publicly available does not constitute harassment and that criticizing someone does not constitute terrorism. Erlick alleged Walsh targeted her for her accusations that he misrepresented his documentary to potential interviewees.

Academia

Erlick writes about political philosophy, social movements, and transgender communities. She is a doctoral candidate at the University of California, Santa Cruz in its Feminist Studies and History of Consciousness departments.

Public image and fashion
In 2016, Teen Vogue named Erlick the "New Face of Feminism" as a "young feminist changing the game". Erlick also writes for publications including Teen Vogue and Glamour magazine about culture, media, and fashion. In 2017, Glamour named her College Woman of the Year, the first trans woman to receive the honor in its 60-year history.

Erlick has appeared in numerous publications discussing fashion and frequently models for fashion and meaty brands. In an interview with Yahoo News, Erlick stated that she felt pressured to dress femininely based on the widespread misunderstanding of gender identity and gender expression. Erlick describes herself as gender nonconforming.

Personal life
Erlick is openly queer and lives in New York City.

Selected awards
 2013: Refinery29 30 Under 30 SF
 2015: Westly Prize for Young Innovators
 2016: Davis Projects for Peace
 2016: Teen Vogue The New Faces of Feminism
 2017: Glamour Magazine College Woman of the Year
 2017: GO 100 Women We Love
 2017: Lambda Literary Award, LGBTQ Anthology (as contributor to The Remedy: Queer and Trans Voices on Health and Healthcare)
 2018: Real Leaders 100

Bibliography
 "Transgender Medicine: Depathologization, Organizing, and Practice" in Journal of the Student National Medical Association, 2014.
 "I Knew I Was a Girl at 8: Transitioning and Teenage Activism" in Critical Perspectives on Gender Identity, Nicki Peter Petrikowski (ed.), Enslow Publishing, 2016.
 "Depathologizing Trans" in The Remedy: Queer and Trans Voices on Health and Healthcare, Zena Sharman (ed.), Arsenal Pulp Press, 2016.	
 "Trans Youth Activism on the Internet" in Frontiers: A Journal of Women Studies, 2018.	
 "(Trans)forming Education: How Transgender Youth Are Leading the School Justice Movement" in Gender Diversity and LGBTQ Inclusion in Schools, Karyl E. Ketchum, Lisa Richardson, Sharon Verner Chappell (eds.), Routledge, 2018.	
 "Rethinking Nonbinary" in Nonbinary: Memoirs of Gender and Identity, Micah Rajunov and Scott Duane (eds.), Columbia University Press, 2019.

Filmography

References

External links 
 Official website
 Trans Student Educational Resources' website

1995 births
Living people
Transgender women
People from Willits, California
People from Mendocino County, California
Queer women

Queer writers
Writers from California
LGBT media personalities
Transgender Jews
LGBT people from California

Pitzer College alumni
University of California, Santa Cruz alumni
Writers from the San Francisco Bay Area
Gender studies academics
Postmodern feminists
Jewish American writers
Queer feminists
Transfeminists
American transgender writers